Anarta crotchii is a species of cutworm or dart moth in the family of Noctuidae.

The MONA or Hodges number for Anarta crotchii is 10233.

References

Further reading

 
 
 

Anarta (moth)
Articles created by Qbugbot
Moths described in 1880